Jeeves and Wooster is a British comedy series that originally aired from 1990 to 1993. The titles are taken from the DVD collections. All episodes run approximately 50 minutes.

The list includes the original British air dates for the series, and the U.S. air dates for episodes that also aired on the American anthology series Masterpiece Theatre. The order in which episodes were broadcast in the United States differs from the original broadcast order, and five episodes were not broadcast on Masterpiece Theatre but were included in American video releases.

Series overview

Episodes

Series 1 (1990)

Series 2 (1991)

Series 3 (1992)

Series 4 (1993)

See also
 List of Jeeves and Wooster characters

References

External links
 

 01
Jeeves and Wooster